Rawle Prince Alkins (born October 29, 1997) is an American professional basketball player for the Salt Lake City Stars of the NBA G League. He played college basketball for the Arizona Wildcats.

High school career 
Alkins first attended Christ the King Regional High School in Queens, New York for three years, where he led them to three New York state catholic championships. After his junior year, Alkins decided to attend Word of God Christian Academy in Raleigh, North Carolina for his senior year. As a senior, he averaged 25 points and 7 rebounds per game. 

Alkins was rated as a five-star recruit and considered a top-20 recruit in the 2016 high school class. He was ranked No. 21 recruit and the 5th best small forward in the Class of 2016 by ESPN, behind Josh Jackson, Jayson Tatum, Miles Bridges, and Jonathan Isaac.

College career
As a freshman, Alkins averaged 10.9 points, 4.9 rebounds and 2.1 assists per game and shot 37 percent from 3-point range. He declared for the 2017 NBA draft but opted to return to Arizona. He missed some games in January 2018 with a broken foot. As a sophomore, Alkins averaged 13.1 points, 4.8 rebounds, and 2.5 assists per game. On March 27, 2018, Alkins declared for the 2018 NBA draft and hired an agent, forgoing his final two years of college eligibility.

Professional career

Chicago Bulls (2018–2019)
After going undrafted in the 2018 NBA draft, Alkins signed with the Toronto Raptors for their Summer League team. After completing his stint there, his performances there would warrant him signing a two-way contract with the Chicago Bulls on July 25. With this contract, he would split his playing time for the season between the Chicago Bulls and their NBA G League affiliate, the Windy City Bulls. Alkins made his NBA debut on December 17, 2018, playing three minutes with a rebound and two assists in a 121–96 loss to the Oklahoma City Thunder. He would go on to make 10 NBA appearances for the Bulls, with averages of 3.7 points, 2.6 rebounds, and 1.3 assists. He made 44 appearances in the G League with the Windy City Bulls. In those games he averaged 11.3 points, 5.5 rebounds, and 2.9 assists, primarily off the bench. Alkins, would be waived at the end of the season. 

Alkins was with Houston Rockets for 2019 NBA Summer League.

FC Porto (2020)
On February 26, 2020, Alkins signed with FC Porto of the Liga Portuguesa de Basquetebol (LPB). He only featured in 2 contests, due to the season suspension, and averaged 16 points, 3 rebounds, 2.5 assists, and 1 steal.

On December 4, 2020, Alkins signed with the New Orleans Pelicans of the NBA. He was waived at the end of training camp and signed by the Erie BayHawks. However, he would be waived on January 26, 2021, without making an appearance for them.

Raptors 905 (2021)
On March 3, 2021, Alkins signed with the Raptors 905 of the NBA G League, the affiliate team of the NBA’s Toronto Raptors. In 3 games for the 905, Alkins averaged 2.7 points, 0.3 rebounds and 0.3 steals.

Gießen 46ers (2021)
On September 3, 2021, he has signed with Gießen 46ers of the Basketball Bundesliga. In two games, Alkins averaged 15 points, three rebounds, one steal and one block per game.

MHP Riesen Ludwigsburg (2021–2022)
On October 7, 2021, Alkins signed with MHP Riesen Ludwigsburg of the Basketball Bundesliga.

Salt Lake City Stars (2022–present)
On October 23, 2022, Alkins joined the Salt Lake City Stars training camp roster.

Career statistics

NBA

Regular season

|-
| style="text-align:left;"| 
| style="text-align:left;"| Chicago
| 10 || 1 || 12.0 || .333 || .250 || .667 || 2.6 || 1.3 || .1 || .0 || 3.7
|- class="sortbottom"
| style="text-align:center;" colspan="2"| Career
| 10 || 1 || 12.0 || .333 || .250 || .667 || 2.6 || 1.3 || .1 || .0 || 3.7

College

|-
| style="text-align:left;"| 2016–17
| style="text-align:left;"| Arizona
| 37 || 36 || 28.0 || .463 || .370 || .733 || 4.9 || 2.1 || .9 || .5 || 10.9
|-
| style="text-align:left;"| 2017–18
| style="text-align:left;"| Arizona
| 23 || 21 || 31.4 || .432 || .359 || .724 || 4.8 || 2.5 || 1.3 || .7 || 13.1
|- class="sortbottom"
| style="text-align:center;" colspan="2"| Career
| 60 || 57 || 29.3 || .450 || .365 || .729 || 4.9 || 2.2 || 1.0 || .6 || 11.8

References

External links
Arizona Wildcats bio

1997 births
Living people
American expatriate basketball people in Germany
American expatriate basketball people in Portugal
American men's basketball players
Arizona Wildcats men's basketball players
Basketball players from New York City
Chicago Bulls players
FC Porto basketball players
Giessen 46ers players
Point guards
Raptors 905 players
Riesen Ludwigsburg players
Salt Lake City Stars players
Shooting guards
Sportspeople from Brooklyn
Sportspeople from the Bronx
Undrafted National Basketball Association players
Windy City Bulls players